The Shire of Mirani was a local government area located in the North Queensland region of Queensland, Australia.

The shire was situated in the Pioneer Valley, and atop the Eungella Range, to the west of Mackay. The area's primary industry is sugar production.

History
Pioneer Division was one of the 74 divisional boards established on 11 November 1879 under the Divisional Boards Act 1879 with a population of 2884 and covered the region surrounding but not including the Borough of Mackay. With the passage of the Local Authorities Act 1902, Pioneer Division became the Shire of Pioneer on 31 March 1903.

The Shire of Mirani was established from part of the Shire of Pioneer on 4 September 1913 under the Local Authorities Act 1902.

On 15 March 2008, under the Local Government (Reform Implementation) Act 2007 passed by the Parliament of Queensland on 10 August 2007, the Shire of Mirani merged with the City of Mackay and Shire of Sarina to form the Mackay Region.

Towns and localities
The Shire of Mirani included the following settlements:

Towns:
 Mirani
 Dows Creek
 Eton
 Finch Hatton
 Gargett
 Marian
 North Eton
 Pinnacle
 Septimus

Localities:
 Benholme
 Crediton
 Dalrymple Heights
 Eungella
 Eungella Dam
 Hazledean
 Kinchant Dam
 Mia Mia
 Mount Martin
 Netherdale
 Owens Creek
 Pinevale

Chairmen
 1927: G. Johnson

Population

References

Former local government areas of Queensland
2008 disestablishments in Australia
Populated places disestablished in 2008